The red-necked crake (Rallina tricolor) is a waterbird in the rail and crake family, Rallidae.

Description
The red-necked crake is a large crake (length 25 cm, wingspan 40 cm, weight 200 g). Its head, neck and breast are red-brown, with a paler version of that color on the throat. The upperparts are grey-brown, while the underparts are grey-brown with pale barring. The underwing is barred black and white, the bill green, and the legs grey-brown.

Distribution and habitat
Red-necked crakes live in the Moluccas, Lesser Sundas, New Guinea lowlands and adjacent islands, and north-eastern Australia. They are found in tropical rainforests and dense vegetation close to permanent wetlands.

Behaviour

Diet
The bird's diet consists of amphibians, aquatic invertebrates, crustaceans and molluscs.

Breeding
The bird rests on or close to ground in dense vegetation. It lays clutches of 3-5 dull-white eggs, the incubation periods of which are around 20 days. The chicks emerge covered in black down, precocial and nidifugous.

Voice
The crake makes repetitive clicking calls and soft grunts.

Conservation
With a large range and no evidence of significant decline, this species is assessed as being of least concern. The species is little studied and seldom seen due to its secretive nature, but appears to be locally common in New Guinea. In Australia it has suffered declines due to habitat loss.

References

 BirdLife International. (2007). Species factsheet: Rallina tricolor. Downloaded from http://www.birdlife.org on 14/6/2007
 Marchant, S.; Higgins, P.J.; & Davies, J.N. (eds). (1994). Handbook of Australian, New Zealand and Antarctic Birds.  Volume 2: Raptors to Lapwings. Oxford University Press: Melbourne.  

red-necked crake
Birds of Queensland
Birds of New Guinea
Birds of the Maluku Islands
Birds of New Ireland Province
red-necked crake
red-necked crake